Splendrillia eva is a species of sea snail, a marine gastropod mollusk in the family Drilliidae.

Description
The length of the shell attains 8.4 mm, its diameter 3.5 mm.

Distribution
This marine species occurs off the upper continental slope of Transkei, South Africa.

References

  Thiele J., 1925. Gastropoden der Deutschen Tiefsee-Expedition. In:. Wissenschaftliche Ergebnisse der Deutschen Tiefsee-Expedition auf dem Dampfer "Valdivia" 1898–1899  II. Teil, vol. 17, No. 2, Gustav Fischer, Berlin
 Kilburn, R.N. (1988) Turridae (Mollusca: Gastropoda) of southern Africa and Mozambique. Part 4. Subfamilies Drilliinae, Crassispirinae and Strictispirinae. Annals of the Natal Museum, 29, 167–320
  Tucker, J.K. 2004 Catalog of recent and fossil turrids (Mollusca: Gastropoda). Zootaxa 682:1–1295.

External links
 

Endemic fauna of South Africa
eva
Gastropods described in 1925